Graveney is a village in Swale, Kent.

Graveney may also refer to:

People
David Graveney (born 1953), Gloucestershire, Somerset and Durham cricketer
Ken Graveney (1924-2015), Gloucestershire cricketer
Tom Graveney (1927-2015), Gloucestershire, Worcestershire and England cricketer

Other
Graveney School
River Graveney, a tributary of the River Wandle